The Bahaddarhat Flyover collapse occurred on 24 November 2012 when steel girders collapsed in the suburb of Bahaddarhat in Chittagong, Bangladesh, killing seventeen people. It was 7:30 pm local time (GMT +6), when suddenly three girders fell down from a flyover (overpass) during construction. The government of Bangladesh announced that sixteen people died at the scene and over fifty people were injured.

Location 

When and what happened 

At 7:30 pm on 24 Nov 2012, the girders collapsed, creating a large boom. Bystanders came to help the victims.

It was estimated that about 500 people were staying beneath these girders. Moreover, there were many customers in the nearby floating market.

Students dwelling around the Bahaddarhat area usually liked to gossip with their friends in front of "Bahaddar Bari Pukur Par" in the evening after finishing their tutorial classes in coaching. There was a place to sit where students found it more comfortable which was under those girders. In the evening of the incident people saw many students gossiping in that place.

Emergency rescue activation 

When the incident took place at first people came forward to help those people who were trapped at that situation. But within 15 minutes the Fire brigade team rushed at that place. An uncertain silence shock came down at whole city. People started howling in Bahaddar Bari as many of the dead people were from that area.

Casualties 

The incident killed 17 people. The girders fell on those people and knocked down all of them. Many dead bodies were not unidentified. About 50 people were injured. Many people turned lame. The whole nation was struck at that terrible moment.

References

Further reading
 
 
 
 
 
 
 
 
 
 
 
 

Construction accidents
Chittagong District
Man-made disasters in Bangladesh
2012 in Bangladesh